SouthLink is an Australian bus service operator in Adelaide. It operates services as part of the Adelaide Metro network under contract to the Government of South Australia. It is a subsidiary of Keolis Downer.

History

In April 2000, SouthLink commenced operating the Adelaide Metro Outer South services with 82 buses under contract to the Government of South Australia, which was won by its parent Australian Transit Enterprises

In April 2005, SouthLink commenced operating the Outer North contract that had previously been run by Serco.

In July 2011, SouthLink commenced an eight-year contract with an optional four-year extension exercisable if performance criteria are met for the Outer North and Outer South areas. It also commenced operating the Hills area services that had been operated by Transitplus.

In March 2015, its parent Australian Transit Enterprises was bought by Keolis Downer and SouthLink was reorganised as a subsidiary of the latter.

On 5 July 2020, SouthLink's Outer South and Outer North bus contracts were taken over by Torrens Transit and Busways respectively, while retaining its Hills contract. As of March 2020, SouthLink is also bidding to operate Adelaide's metropolitan train network.

Fleet
As at December 2022, the fleet consisted of 79 buses.

Depots
SouthLink operate depots in Aldgate and Mount Barker.

See also
Adelaide Metro
Buses in Adelaide
Transport in Adelaide

References

External links
Company website
Adelaide Metro

Bus companies of South Australia
Keolis
Transport in Adelaide
Transport companies established in 2000
Australian companies established in 2000